The following active airports serve the area around Fort Simpson, Northwest Territories, Canada:

See also

List of airports in the Northwest Territories

References

 
Fort Simpson
Fort Simpson
Fort Smith